The Treatment Advocacy Center (TAC) is a U.S. non-profit organization based in Arlington, Virginia, originally announced as the NAMI Treatment Action Centre in 1997. The TAC was subsequently directed by psychiatrist E. Fuller Torrey and identifies its mission as "dedicated to eliminating barriers to the timely and effective treatment of severe mental illness". The organization is most well-known for proposed laws, policies, and practices regarding legally compelled outpatient services or outpatient commitment for people diagnosed with mental illness (also known as assisted outpatient treatment, AOT). The organization identifies its other key issues as "anosognosia, consequences of non-treatment, criminalization of mental illness, psychiatric bed shortages, public service costs, violence and mental illness". TAC has been subject to criticism by mental health advocates for promoting coercion and forced treatment.

History

Although according to the TAC website, E. Fuller Torrey founded the Treatment Advocacy Center in 1998 as an offshoot of the National Alliance on Mental Illness (NAMI), other sources indicate that the original name was the NAMI Treatment Action Center. Laurie Flynn, the NAMI director at the time, stated in a press release, "It's a national disgrace that, in this age of remarkable progress in brain research and treatment, so many individuals are left out in the cold". TAC received initial financial support from Theodore and Vada Stanley, founders of the Stanley Medical Research Institute; TAC was founded as an affiliate organization with a separate executive director and board. The organization operates with funding from the affiliated Stanley Medical Research Institute, a non-profit organization which provides funding for research into bipolar disorder and schizophrenia in the United States. Torrey is currently a member of the Treatment Advocacy Center's board and is executive director of the Stanley Medical Research Institute. The relationship between Torrey and NAMI seemed to sour according to sources, with Torrey being disinvited from NAMI's national convention in 2012 after advocates protested his TAC involvement and promotion of outpatient commitment.

Areas of Focus

The Treatment Advocacy Center activities and projects include:

 Developed a template law for legally mandated outpatient mental health treatment.  Released in 2000, the draft text is meant as a legal framework for authorizing court-ordered treatment of individuals diagnosed with mental illness who are determined by the court to meet certain legal criteria around dangerousness to self or others or inability to care for oneself due to a mental illness. 
 Research and study into public policy and other issues related specific to serious mental illness.
 Education of policymakers and judges regarding TAC's viewpoint on serious mental illness; TAC's opinion is that more legally mandated treatment and increases in hospital beds will improve care.

Controversy
TAC's major focus on legally mandated treatment is opposed by other advocacy groups. The Bazelon Center for Mental Health Law in a statement on forced treatment states "[n]ot only is forced treatment a serious rights violation, it is counterproductive. Fear of being deprived of autonomy discourages people from seeking care. Coercion undermines therapeutic relationships and long-term treatment." Daniel Fischer, founder of National Coalition for Mental Health Recovery, described outpatient commitment as a "a slippery slope" back to the kind of mass institutionalization seen in the 1940s and '50s".

See also

 Deinstitutionalization
 Kendra's Law
 Laura's Law
 Outpatient commitment
 Psychiatric hospital

References

External links
 Treatment Advocacy Center Online
 TACReports.org 

Mental health in the United States
Organizations established in 1998
Political advocacy groups in the United States
Mental health law in the United States
Treatment of bipolar disorder